Nyabinghi is one of the oldest denominations, or "Orders", of the Rastafari movement.

Probably the largest Rastafari group, the House of Nyabinghi is an aggregate of more traditional and militant Rastas who seek to retain the movement close to the way in which it existed during the 1940s. They stress the idea that Haile Selassie was Jah and the second coming of Jesus. 

It was founded by Rastafari elders such as Ras Boanerges, Bredda Authur and others. 

The name was supposedly taken from a legendary Rwandan, Ugandan, or Tanzanian woman whose name is said to mean "she who possesses many things".
This woman's name later inspired the Nyabinghi rebellion movement that began in Uganda. Some people think this name was later taken by some members of the Rastafari movement and was used to create a current frame of thought. 

This name, Niyabinghi, was actually mainly attributed to the prisoners across the contienent of Africa and later groups of people in Jamaica (mainly from Pinnacle, the Rastafarian camp of Leonard P. Howell) who were going on hunger strikes and rebelling against the short Italian occupation of Ethiopia and the exile of Haile Selassie during the "Scatter for Africa" after the Berlin Conference. 

They also didn't cut their hair in rebellion, which eventually grew into dreadlocks and was against the social norms at the time. 

After Selassie came back to Ethiopia, the prisoners were freed but their diet voluntarily consisted of little to no meat. They were internationally revered as warrior monks similar to the Levites of the Tanakh; adopting some of the same lifestyle choices (e.g., not cutting their hair). 

Later, the Rastafarian mansion of Niyabinghi was officially established, and shortly followed by 12 tribes of Israel Mansion. 

Some people say the meaning attributed by the Rastas at the name Nyabinghi is "death and judgment to all black and white oppressors".   

The Nyabinghi order is one of the most widespread currents of Rastafari thought worldwide.

References

Citations

Sources 

 

Rastafari